Alex Laurent (born 6 June 1993) is a Luxembourgian professional basketball player for Gladiators Trier of the German ProA league. He is also a member of the Luxembourg national basketball team.

Professional career
From 2012 until 2017, Laurent played for BBC Amicale in the Luxembourgian first division Total League. Laurent's best season was the 2013–14 season, in which he averaged 11.4 points in 24.8 minutes per game. In his last two seasons with Amicale, he won the Luxembourgian national championship.

On 27 July 2017 Laurent signed with Den Helder Suns of the Dutch Basketball League (DBL). He averaged 11.3 points and 4.9 rebounds per game in his first year on the team. On 17 July 2018 Laurent re-signed with the squad. In July 2018, he re-signed for another season with Den Helder.

On June 12, 2022, he signed with Gladiators Trier of the German ProA league.

References

1993 births
Living people
BBC Amicale Steinsel players
Den Helder Suns players
Klosterneuburg Dukes players
Luxembourgian men's basketball players
People from Luxembourg City
Power forwards (basketball)